Sidi Amrane (also written Sīdī Amran) is a town and commune in Djamaa District, El Oued Province, Algeria,  south of Djamaa. According to the 2008 census it has a population of 21,772, up from 18,732 in 1998, and an annual growth rate of 1.5%.

Climate

Sidi Amrane has a hot desert climate (Köppen climate classification BWh), with very hot summers and mild winters. Rainfall is light and sporadic, and summers are particularly dry.

Transportation

Sidi Amrane is connect by two short local roads to the national highway N3; one road leads directly west, and the other leads north through Djamaa. The N3 runs from Biskra in the north to Touggourt in the south. There is also a station on the Biskra-Touggourt railway line at Djamaa.

Education

5.8% of the population has a tertiary education, and another 17.2% has completed secondary education. The overall literacy rate is 78.4%, and is 85.1% among males and 72.1% among females.

Localities
The commune of Sidi Amrane is composed of six localities:

Sidi Amrane
Aïn Choucha
Tamerna Djedida
Tamerna Guedima
Zaoualia
Chémora

References

Neighbouring towns and cities

Communes of El Oued Province
Cities in Algeria
Algeria